"My Beyoncé" is a song by American rapper Lil Durk featuring fellow American rapper Dej Loaf, released on November 9, 2015 as a single. It appears on Durk's mixtape 300 Days, 300 Nights (2015) and his second studio album Lil Durk 2X (2016). The song was produced by C-Sick.

Background
In October 2015, the song was previewed in a profile of producer No I.D.

Composition
Meaghan Garvey of Pitchfork called the song "a Midwestern rap romance averse to gooey histrionics, where being ride-or-die is not so much a glamorous choice but a given." Lil Durk and Dej Loaf take the role of a couple in love; in Auto-Tuned vocals, Durk professes his "devotion and infatuation" for Loaf, whom he calls his "Beyoncé", singing, "Ooh I like the way she move / Shawty my baby, my everything, she the truth". Loaf also expresses her love, singing, "Leave your girl, be through with that / Get with DeJ, he ain't never going back" and "Durk and Dej, I'm thinking about changing my last name".

Music video
A music video for the song was released on January 11, 2016. It features Lil Durk and Dej Loaf at a basketball court, where they rap and shoot hoops.

Charts

Certifications

References

2015 singles
2015 songs
Lil Durk songs
Dej Loaf songs
Def Jam Recordings singles
Songs written by Lil Durk
Songs written by Dej Loaf